Verdelle is both a surname and a given name. Notable people with the name include:

A.J. Verdelle (born 1960), American novelist
Verdelle Smith, American singer

See also 
 Verdell (disambiguation)